State Route 582 (SR 582) is an east–west state highway in the northwestern portion of the U.S. state of Ohio.

Route description

SR 582 passes through the northern half of Wood County and a small portion of northwestern Sandusky County along its way.  No part of SR 582 is incorporated within the National Highway System, a system of routes determined to be most important for the nation's economy, mobility and defense.

History
SR 582 was established in 1940.  Its original routing matches that which it utilizes to this day between SR 65 and SR 105 through northern Wood County and northwestern Sandusky County.  SR 582 has not experienced any significant changes since its inception.

Major intersections

References

External links

582
Transportation in Sandusky County, Ohio
Transportation in Wood County, Ohio